Angel Lynn Boris (born August 2, 1974) is an American model and actress sometimes credited as Angel Boris Reed.

Career
Boris was born in Fort Lauderdale, Florida. After entering the Venus Swimwear international model search in 1994, she was discovered by Playboy photographer David Chan. While working for Hawaiian Tropic, she appeared in a Playboy pictorial featuring the women of Hawaiian Tropic, and in July 1996, she became Playboy'''s Playmate of the Month. Her centerfold was photographed by Richard Fegley. She appeared in many special editions of the magazine.

She has also acted in several films (like Warlock III: The End of Innocence) and has appeared on numerous television shows and music videos (e.g., Monster Magnet - "Heads Explode"). Boris appeared in five episodes of the TV show Beverly Hills, 90210 during season eight, as Emma Bennett, a journalist who seduces Brandon Walsh. Boris also competed on the Playmate edition of the NBC show Fear Factor, coming in second to Lauren Michelle Hill.

In 2001, she appeared on the TV soap opera General Hospital for about six months, playing a character whose name was also Angel. In 2002, she made an appearance on The King of Queens.

In 2006, she played the role of Cindy in the feature film The Still Life''.

References

External links 
 

1974 births
Living people
American television actresses
Actresses from Fort Lauderdale, Florida
1990s Playboy Playmates
Miss Hawaiian Tropic delegates
21st-century American women